Austin Robertson may refer to:

 Austin Robertson Sr. (1907-1988), Australian rules footballer, father of Austin, Jr.
 Austin Robertson Jr. (born 1943), Australian rules footballer, son of Austin, Sr.